The Verdict was an Australian television panel discussion program on the Nine Network, hosted by news journalist and Today Show host, Karl Stefanovic, which premiered on 8 October 2015.

A pilot for the series was ordered by the Nine Network in August 2015, to be filmed the following month. The series was green-lit on 14 September 2015 for 8 episodes to air on Sundays at 9:30pm from 11 October 2015. However, the series was moved prior to launch to the Thursday 8:30pm timeslot starting from 8 October 2015. In addition, it was announced the network had only committed to 5 episodes.

On 28 October 2015, the series was renewed for a second season, which was set to air in 2016, but the series has since been cancelled.

Format

The Verdict has been modelled on a mixture of Q&A and The Project, and features a rotating panel of guest. They discuss hot-button issues in front of a live audience. The panel give fielding opinions from the studio audience, while viewers at home can vote on weekly topics. Host Karl Stefanovic injects his own opinion into the show, something he has been doing increasingly while hosting Today.

Episodes

Season 1

References

Nine Network original programming
2015 Australian television series debuts
Australian television talk shows
English-language television shows